Chris Summers (born 7 November 1974) is mostly known for his work with the Norwegian deathpunk band Turbonegro (in Norwegian: Turboneger), where he played the drums from 1998 to 2008.

Engen has also played with the Norwegian band BigBang.

He was engaged to Norwegian singer Elvira Nikolaisen.

References

External links 
turbonegro.com
turbojugend.net

1970 births
Living people
Norwegian rock drummers
Male drummers
Turbonegro members
21st-century Norwegian drummers
Bigbang (Norwegian band) members